Kim Attlesey (born June 26, 1953) is an American athlete. She competed in the women's long jump at the 1972 Summer Olympics.

References

External links
 

1953 births
Living people
Athletes (track and field) at the 1972 Summer Olympics
American female long jumpers
Olympic track and field athletes of the United States
21st-century American women